is a song by Japanese American singer-songwriter Hikaru Utada. It is their first single under the label Epic Records Japan, from their upcoming seventh Japanese-language studio album, Hatsukoi. The song is being used as a tie-in for Suntory Water campaign starring Utada, starting on June 10, and was released as a digital download on July 10.

Commercial performance
The song debuted at #1 in the Japanese iTunes Store and those of six other countries. In Japan, it achieved #1 position across eight different musical download services. On the issue dated July 24, "Ōzora de Dakishimete" debuted at #3 on the Billboard Japan Hot 100, while coming in at #5 on the Radio Songs chart and #1 in digital downloads. In its second week, the song fell 16 places to #19 on the Hot 100, while improving one position to #4 on the Radio Songs chart. In its third week, it fell to #37 on the Hot 100, while also dropping 13 places to #17 on the Radio Songs chart. After four weeks, the song fell off the Hot 100 and Radio Songs chart.

Track listing

Release history

Charts

Weekly charts

Certifications

References

Hikaru Utada songs
Songs written by Hikaru Utada
2017 singles
2017 songs